Malaza empyreus is a butterfly in the family Hesperiidae. It is found on Madagascar (Ile Sainte Marie and Sakavalona). The habitat consists of forests.

References

Butterflies described in 1878
Erionotini
Butterflies of Africa
Taxa named by Paul Mabille